George Graff may refer to:

 George Graff Jr. (1886–1973), American songwriter
 George L. Graff, American industrial designer